The 2009 FIFA U-20 World Cup was the 17th edition of the FIFA U-20 World Cup, which was hosted by Egypt from 24 September to 16 October 2009. The tournament was initially going to take place between 10 and 31 July. However, the 2009 FIFA Confederations Cup was played mid-year, resulting in both that year's U-20 and U-17 World Cups being played at the end of the year. The tournament was won by Ghana after they defeated Brazil on penalties in the final, becoming the first African team to win the tournament.

Player eligibility 
Only players born on or after 1 January 1989 were eligible to compete.

Venues

Qualification 
Twenty-three teams qualified for the 2009 FIFA U-20 World Cup. As the host team, Egypt received automatic entry to the cup, bringing the total number of teams to twenty-four for the tournament.

1.Teams that made their debut.

Match officials

Squads

Allocation of teams to groups 
Teams were allocated to groups on the basis of geographical spread. Teams were placed in four pots, and one team was drawn from each pot for each group. Pot 1 contained the five African teams plus one from CONMEBOL; Pot 2 contained the remaining teams from the Americas excluding one CONCACAF team; Pot 3 consisted of teams from Asia and Oceania plus the remaining CONCACAF team; Pot 4 consisted of teams from the European confederation.

Group stage 
The draw for the group stages was held on 5 April 2009 at Luxor Temple. Each group winner and runner-up teams, as well as the best four third-placed teams, qualified for the first round of the knockout stage (round of 16).

Group A

Group B

Group C

Group D

Group E

Group F

Ranking of third-placed teams

Knockout stage

Round of 16

Quarter-finals

Semi-finals

Third place match

Final

Winner

Awards

Goalscorers 
With eight goals, Dominic Adiyiah is the top scorers in the tournament. In total, 167 goals were scored by 105 different players, with one of them credited as own goals.

8 goals
  Dominic Adiyiah

5 goals
  Vladimir Koman

4 goals

  Alan Kardec
  Ransford Osei
  Aarón
  Yonathan del Valle
  Salomón Rondón

3 goals

  Alex Teixeira
  Marco Ureña Porras
  Krisztián Németh
  Kermit Erasmus
  Kim Min-woo
  Fran Mérida

2 goals

  Maicon
  Josué Martínez
  Jan Chramosta
  Michael Rabušic
  Jan Vošahlík
  Afroto
  Hossam Arafat
  Bogy
  Ahmed Shoukry
  Semih Aydilek
  Lewis Holtby
  Björn Kopplin
  Richard Sukuta-Pasu
  André Ayew
  Mario Martínez
  Michelangelo Albertazzi
  Mattia Mustacchio
  Kim Bo-kyung
  Ander Herrera
  Kike
  Emilio Nsue
  Ahmed Khalil
  Nicolás Lodeiro
  Jonathan Urretavizcaya

1 goal

  James Holland
  Aaron Mooy
  Boquita
  Ciro
  Douglas Costa
  Giuliano
  Ganso
  Andre Akono Effa
  Germain Tiko
  Banana Yaya
  Diego Estrada
  David Guzmán
  Diego Madrigal
  José Mena
  Tomáš Pekhart
  Mohamed Talaat
  Alex Nimely-Tchuimeni
  Florian Jungwirth
  Manuel Schäffler
  Mario Vrančić
  Abeiku Quansah
  Mohammed Rabiu
  Arnold Peralta
  Ádám Balajti
  András Debreceni
  Márkó Futács
  Máté Kiss
  Zsolt Korcsmár
  Ádám Présinger
  Giacomo Bonaventura
  Umberto Eusepi
  Andrea Mazzarani
  Antonio Mazzotta
  Silvano Raggio Garibaldi
  Daniel Adejo
  Ibok Edet
  Kehinde Fatai
  Rabiu Ibrahim
  Nwankwo Obiorah
  Nurudeen Orelesi
  Danny Uchechi
  Aldo Paniagua
  Federico Santander
  Andile Jali
  Sibusiso Khumalo
  Kim Dong-sub
  Kim Young-gwon
  Koo Ja-cheol
  Park Hee-seong
  Dani Parejo
  Juma Clarence
  Jean Luc Rochford
  Mohamed Ahmed
  Ahmed Ali
  Hamdan Al Kamali
  Theyab Awana
  Bryan Arguez
  Dilly Duka
  Brian Ownby
  Tony Taylor
  Santiago García
  Abel Hernández
  Tabaré Viudez
  Sherzod Karimov
  Ivan Nagaev
  Óscar Rojas
  José Manuel Velázquez

1 own goal
  Luke DeVere (playing against Costa Rica)

Final ranking

References

External links 
 FIFA U-20 World Cup Egypt 2009 , FIFA.com
 RSSSF > FIFA World Youth Championship > 2009
 FIFA Technical Report

 
2009–10 in Egyptian football
2009
2009 in association football
2009
Sports competitions in Cairo
Sport in Alexandria
Sport in Port Said
September 2009 sports events in Africa
October 2009 sports events in Africa
2009 in youth association football
Football in Cairo